The following events occurred in February 1926:

Monday, February 1, 1926
The John Colton play The Shanghai Gesture opened on Broadway.
Land on Broadway and Wall Street in New York City was sold at a record $7 per sq inch.

Tuesday, February 2, 1926
In Germany, four members of the illegal Black Reichswehr paramilitary organization were sentenced to death for politically motivated murders. State authorities had the court proceedings carried out under a veil of secrecy to "insure the safety of the state." 
Baseball's National League held a banquet to celebrate its 50th anniversary at the Hotel Astor in New York.  
Born: Valéry Giscard d'Estaing, 20th President of France, in Koblenz, Germany (d. 2020), Richard Dickson Cudahy in Milwaukee, Wisconsin
Died: William Madison Wood, 68, American textile mill owner (suicide)

Wednesday, February 3, 1926
Czech became the official language of Czechoslovakia, though minority language rights were guaranteed. 
20 miners were killed in an explosion in Horning, Pennsylvania.

Thursday, February 4, 1926
A $250 million, five-year plan to upgrade the United States Naval Air Force was submitted to the House Committee on Naval Affairs. The plan called to nearly double the number of Navy planes from 638 to 1,248 by the end of 1931. 
Born: Dave Sands, boxer, in Kempsey, New South Wales, Australia (d. 1952)

Friday, February 5, 1926
10,000 people packed the streets of Los Angeles to watch the funeral procession of actress Barbara La Marr, who died on January 30 at the age of 29. Numerous injuries were reported as onlookers, mostly women, rushed forward to get a view of the silver coffin.

Saturday, February 6, 1926

An unknown party raided the grave of Pancho Villa and stole the Mexican revolutionary leader's skull. The fate of the skull is a mystery and the source of multiple legends, with one holding that it is in the Skull and Bones Crypt at Yale University.
Benito Mussolini made a defiant speech to his Cabinet on the issue of the Italianization of South Tyrol. Responding to protests from Germany about the oppression of Tyrolean Germans, Mussolini vowed that the policy would "not change by a centimeter" and declared, "We will make this territory Italian because it is Italian geographically and historically." He warned, "If the Germans attempt a boycott, we will answer with boycotts squared. If Germany takes reprisals, we will answer with reprisals cubed."  
Died: Carrie Clark Ward, 64, American actress

Sunday, February 7, 1926
The Italian army seized Jaghbub, the Libyan desert oasis village and home of the Senussi Movement. The column of 2,000 troops met with no resistance.

African-American historian Carter G. Woodson initiated "Negro History Week", the precursor of Black History Month.
Born: Konstantin Feoktistov, cosmonaut, in Voronezh, USSR (d. 2009)

Monday, February 8, 1926
Seán O'Casey's The Plough and the Stars opened at the Abbey Theatre in Dublin.
Torrent, the first American film to star Greta Garbo, premiered at the Capitol Theatre in New York City, ahead of a general release on February 21.
In Stockholm, Sweden, Herma Szabo of Austria won the Ladies Competition of the World Figure Skating Championships for the fifth consecutive year.
Born: Neal Cassady, writer, in Salt Lake City, Utah (d. 1968)
Died: William Bateson, 64, English geneticist

Tuesday, February 9, 1926
Flooding hit London suburbs after 18 days of rain.
The Reichstag passed a declaration responding to Mussolini's speech of February 6, stating that Germany "vigorously rejects the Italian prime minister's objectively unjustifiable and insultingly phrased attacks and sneers." It went on to say, "Although the German people desire nothing more than to promote their own restoration in peaceful coöperation with other peoples, they will not permit themselves to be hindered from demanding the just treatment of German minorities under foreign sovereignty."

Wednesday, February 10, 1926
Germany formally applied to join the League of Nations.
The war of words between Germany and Italy continued, as Mussolini warned the League of Nations to stay out of the South Tyrol dispute and reaffirmed that Italy would "not accept any discussion of this matter by any assembly or council." Germany responded that it considered the matter closed until such time as it could be addressed by the League. 
Born: Danny Blanchflower, footballer, in Belfast, Northern Ireland (d. 1993)

Thursday, February 11, 1926
The Calles government nationalized all property of the Roman Catholic church in Mexico.
Born: Paul Bocuse, chef, in Collonges-au-Mont-d'Or, France (d. 2018); Alexander Gibson, composer, in Motherwell, Scotland (d. 1995); and Leslie Nielsen, actor, in Regina, Saskatchewan (d. 2010)

Friday, February 12, 1926
The Irish minister for Justice, Kevin O'Higgins, appointed the Committee on Evil Literature.

Saturday, February 13, 1926
The Calles government ordered all Catholic schools in Mexico to close.
Died: Henry Holt, 86, American book publisher and author

Sunday, February 14, 1926
The Nazi Party held the Bamberg Conference.
Willy Böckl of Austria won the Men's Competition of the World Figure Skating Championships in Berlin.
Kikuna, Motosumiyoshi, Tammachi and Tsunashima railway stations opened in Japan.
Born: Al Brodax, producer, in Brooklyn, New York

Monday, February 15, 1926

The Orpheum Theatre opened in Los Angeles.
Canadian Prime Minister William Lyon Mackenzie King won a by-election in Prince Albert, Saskatchewan, ending the unusual situation of a Prime Minister governing without his own seat in the Parliament.

Tuesday, February 16, 1926
French tennis star Suzanne Lenglen defeated U.S. champion Helen Wills in a special match at Cannes.
Born: Margot Frank, older sister of Anne Frank (d. 1945); and John Schlesinger, actor and director, in Palm Springs, California (d. 2003)

Wednesday, February 17, 1926
The Grand National Assembly of Turkey approved a secular civil code to regulate matters of marriage, inheritance, divorce and adoption.
Born: John Meyendorff, Orthodox theologian, in Neuilly-sur-Seine, France (d. 1992)

Thursday, February 18, 1926
Ayn Rand arrived in the United States.
Born: Len Ford, American football player, in Washington, D.C. (d. 1972)

Friday, February 19, 1926
The Olympia Theatre opened in Miami, Florida.

Saturday, February 20, 1926
The Berlin International Green Week debuted in Berlin.
Born: Whitney Blake, actress, in Eagle Rock, Los Angeles, California (d. 2002); Richard Matheson, writer, in Allendale, New Jersey (d. 2013); and Bob Richards, track and field athlete, in Champaign, Illinois (d. 2023)

Sunday, February 21, 1926
A pastoral letter read in all the Catholic churches in Austria condemned the "cult of the body" in present-day gymnastics, denouncing mixed bathing, rhythmic dancing and immodest sports attire as "un-Christian."
Died: Heike Kamerlingh Onnes, 72, Dutch physicist and Nobel Prize laureate

Monday, February 22, 1926
20,000 fans packed the Fulford-Miami Speedway to witness the first race at the world's fastest speedway, won by Pete DePaolo. It was the only race ever held at the speedway, as it was destroyed in the Great Miami Hurricane later that year and never rebuilt.
A letter dispatched from Pope Pius XI to the Italian government said that he would not recognize any church reform laws that it passed until an accord was reached, which could not happen as long as the Roman Question remained unsettled.
Born: Kenneth Williams, actor, in Islington, London, England (d. 1988)

Tuesday, February 23, 1926

In Mexico City, 7 Catholics were killed in clashes between rioters and government agents who were taking over the Church of the Holy Family.  
U.S. President Calvin Coolidge expressed opposition to ex-general Billy Mitchell's advocation of a large air force, saying it would make the United States a militaristic nation and lead to an arms race.

Wednesday, February 24, 1926
French pilot Leon Collet was killed attempting to fly under the arch of the Eiffel Tower in a filmed stunt. The plane struck an aerial belonging to the wireless station.
The film La Bohème, starring Lillian Gish and John Gilbert, opened.
Died: John Jacob Bausch, 95, German-American optician who co-founded Bausch & Lomb; and  Eddie Plank, 50, American baseball player and MLB Hall of Famer

Thursday, February 25, 1926

Spanish Army Colonel and future dictator of Spain Francisco Franco was promoted to the rank of Brigadier General.
Born: Billy Darnell, professional wrestler, in Camden, New Jersey (d. 2007)

Friday, February 26, 1926
At Madison Square Garden, Tiger Flowers defeated Harry Greb to win boxing's World Middleweight Title.
Louis Armstrong and his Hot Five recorded "Heebie Jeebies", the song that made Armstrong a star as well as the first to popularize the technique of scat singing.

Saturday, February 27, 1926
600 members of the Sicilian Mafia were arrested in Italy, including two mayors and other municipal officials.
Born: David H. Hubel, neurophysiologist and recipient of the Nobel Prize in Physiology or Medicine, in Windsor, Ontario, Canada (d. 2013)

Sunday, February 28, 1926
Henry Simpson Lunn announced that he would turn over all his property and income except for $2,500 a year to promote unity among all churches and nations.
Born: Svetlana Alliluyeva, writer and only daughter of Joseph Stalin, in Moscow (d. 2011)

References

1926
1926-02
1926-02